"Attention" is a song by Ulrikke Brandstorp. It would have represented Norway in the Eurovision Song Contest 2020. The song was released as a digital download on 31 January 2020. A simple ballad accompanied by a violin, it is about unrequited love.

Eurovision Song Contest

The song was supposed to represent Norway in the Eurovision Song Contest 2020, after Ulrikke was selected through Melodi Grand Prix 2020, the music competition that selects Norway's entries for the Eurovision Song Contest. On 28 January 2020, a special allocation draw was held which placed each country into one of the two semi-finals, as well as which half of the show they would perform in. Norway was placed into the first semi-final, to be held on 12 May 2020, and was scheduled to perform in the second half of the show.

Charts

Release history

References

2020 singles
2020 songs
Eurovision songs of 2020
Eurovision songs of Norway
Songs written by Christian Ingebrigtsen
Songs written by Kjetil Mørland
Melodi Grand Prix songs